Raven Klaasen and Leander Paes were the defending champions, but Klaasen chose not to compete this year and Paes chose to participate in Sydney instead.

Mate Pavić and Michael Venus won the title, defeating Eric Butorac and Scott Lipsky in the final, 7–5, 6–4.

Seeds

Draw

Draw

References
 Main Draw

ATP Auckland Open
ASB Classic - Doubles
ASB Classic - Men's Doubles